Yekkeh Tut-e Pain (also Romanized as Yekkeh Tūt-e Pā’īn; also known as Yekkeh Tūt-e Soflá) is a village in Maraveh Tappeh Rural District, in the Central District of Maraveh Tappeh County, Golestan Province, Iran. At the 2006 census, its population was 330, in 62 families.

References 

Populated places in Maraveh Tappeh County